Kiryat Shlomo (lit. Place of Shlomo) is a psychiatric and geriatric hospital in Israel, that has the status of an institutional settlement.

History
The community was established in 1945.

References

Hospitals in Israel
Populated places established in 1945
1945 establishments in Mandatory Palestine
Populated places in Central District (Israel)